is a Japanese kickboxer, currently signed with ONE Championship. He is the former Shoot boxing Super Bantamweight champion. As of November 24, 2022, he is ranked #4 in the ONE Flyweight Muay Thai rankings.

Kickboxing career

SHOOTBOXING
Naito made his professional debut against Hikaru Kawano in July 2011. He won the fight by unanimous decision. Naito won 13 of his next 15 fights, before being scheduled to fight a rematch with one of the two men who had defeated him, Kazuyuki Fushimi, for the SHOOT BOXING Japan Super Bantamweight title. He defeated Fushimi by knockout in the fourth round.

Naito won his next three fights, before taking part in the BLADE FC 55 kg tournament, held during BLADE FC 2. In the quarterfinal, he knocked Masahide Kudo out with a right hook in the first round. In the semifinals, he defeated Yuta Murakoshi by unanimous decision. In the tournament final, he faced the pound for pound great Tenshin Nasukawa. Nasukawa won the fight by TKO in the first round, managing to knock Naito down three times in the first round.

He then won his next two shootboxing fights against Yukinori Ogasawara and Takanobu Sano, before losing a muay thai rules bout against Eisaku Ogasawara. He defended his Shootboxing title with a third round knockout of Seiki Ueyama. 

He won two more shootboxing bouts, before unsuccessfully challenging for the Shootboxing Featherweight title held at the time by Kazuki Fukada, losing by majority decision at SHOOT BOXING 2017 act.3. In his next fight, he defended his super bantamweight title, winning the rematch with Seiki Ueyama by unanimous decision.

RISE DoA Tournament
After these two title fights, Naito participated in the 2017 RISE DEAD or Alive −57kg tournament. In the quarterfinals, he faced Kento Haraguchi. Their fight went into an extra round, after which Naito won a decision. Moving on to the semifinals, Naito defeated Masahide Kudo by unanimous decision. He won the tournament, with a fourth round knockout of MOMOTARO.

At RISE 129, Naito fought a rematch with Tenshin Nasukawa. Nasukawa would dominate, as he did in their first fight, again dropping Naito thrice in the first round, winning by TKO.

ONE Championship
Naito made his ONE Championship debut against Alexi Serepisos at ONE Championship: Dawn Of Valor. He won the fight by a third round TKO. In his next fight, he faced Rui Botelho, whom he defeated by unanimous decision. In his third ONE fight, Naito fought Savvas Michael, winning the fight by unanimous decision.

He fought in a ONE main event for the first time at ONE Championship: Big Bang 2, when he fought the former ONE Flyweight Muay Thai World Champion Jonathan Haggerty. Haggerty won the fight by unanimous decision, dropping Naito in both the first and the second round.

Naito was scheduled to fight Wang Wenfeng at ONE: Full Blast 2. Naito won the fight by unanimous decision, landing numerous leg kicks on his opponent throughout the three round bout.

Naito faced Petchdam Petchyindee Academy at ONE Championship: Revolution on September 24, 2021. He won the close bout via split decision.

Naito was booked to face Superlek Kiatmuu9 in the quarterfinals of the ONE Muay Thai Flyweight Grand Prix at ONE 157 on May 20, 2022. He lost the bout via unanimous decision and was eliminated from the grand prix.

Naito faced Amir Naseri in a muay thai rules bout at ONE on Prime Video 3 on October 22, 2022. He won the fight by unanimous decision.

Titles and accomplishments
RISE
 2017 RISE Dead or Alive -57 kg Tournament Champion
BLADE Fighting Championship
 2015 BLADE Japan Cup -55kg runner-up
Shoot Boxing
 2014 SHOOT BOXING Japan Super Bantamweight Champion (defended twice)

Fight record

|-  style="background:#cfc;"
| 2022-10-22 || Win ||align=left| Amir Naseri || ONE on Prime Video 3 || Kuala Lumpur, Malaysia || Decision (Unanimous) || 3 || 3:00 
|-  style="background:#fbb;"
| 2022-05-20|| Loss ||align=left| Superlek Kiatmuu9 ||  ONE 157 || Kallang, Singapore || Decision (Unanimous) || 3 || 3:00
|-
! style=background:white colspan=9 |
|-  style="background:#cfc;"
| 2021-09-24|| Win ||align=left| Petchdam Petchyindee Academy || ONE Championship: Revolution || Kallang, Singapore || Decision (Split) || 3 || 3:00
|-  style="text-align:center; background:#cfc;"
| 2021-06-11|| Win ||align=left| Wang Wenfeng ||  |ONE Championship: Full Blast 2 || Kallang, Singapore ||  Decision (Unanimous) || 3 || 3:00
|-  style="text-align:center; background:#FFBBBB;"
| 2020-12-04|| Loss ||align=left| Jonathan Haggerty ||  |ONE Championship: Big Bang 2 || Kallang, Singapore || Decision (Unanimous) || 3 || 3:00
|-  style="text-align:center; background:#cfc;"
| 2020-02-07|| Win ||align=left| Savvas Michael ||  |ONE Championship: Warrior’s Code || Jakarta, Indonesia || Decision (Unanimous)  || 3 || 3:00
|-  style="text-align:center; background:#CCFFCC;"
| 2019-12-09|| Win||align=left| Rui Botelho ||  |ONE Championship: Mark Of Greatness || Kuala Lumpur, Malaysia ||  Decision (Unanimous) || 3 || 3:00
|-  style="text-align:center; background:#CCFFCC;"
| 2019-10-26|| Win ||align=left| Alexi Serepisos ||  |ONE Championship: Dawn Of Valor || Jakarta, Indonesia || TKO (Referee Stoppage) || 3 || 2:45
|-  style="text-align:center; background:#CCFFCC;"
| 2019-09-01|| Win ||align=left| Yuta Watanabe|| ONE Japan Series: Road to Century || Tokyo, Japan || KO (Right High Kick) || 1 || 1:22
|- style="text-align:center; background:#FFBBBB;"
| 2019-06-23|| Loss|| align="left" | Hiroki Kasahara || Shoot Boxing 2019 act.3 ||Tokyo, Japan|| 2nd Ext.R Decision (Majority) || 5 || 3:00
|- style="text-align:center; background:#FFBBBB;"
| 2018-11-17|| Loss|| align="left" | Tenshin Nasukawa || RISE 129 ||Saitama, Japan|| TKO (3 knockdowns) || 1 || 1:58
|-
|-  style="text-align:center; background:#CCFFCC;"
| 2018-08-12|| Win ||align=left| Hannya Hashimoto|| Rizin 12 – Nagoya || Nagoya, Japan || TKO (leg kicks) || 2 || 1:53
|-  style="text-align:center; background:#CCFFCC;"
| 2017-11-23|| Win||align=left| MOMOTARO || RISE 121 - DEAD or ALIVE -57 kg Tournament, Final || Tokyo, Japan || Ext.R KO (Left Straight) || 4|| 0:58
|-
! style=background:white colspan=9 |
|-  style="text-align:center; background:#CCFFCC;"
| 2017-11-23|| Win||align=left| Masahide Kudo || RISE 121 - DEAD or ALIVE -57 kg Tournament, Semi Final || Tokyo, Japan || Decision (Unanimous) || 3|| 3:00
|-  style="text-align:center; background:#CCFFCC;"
| 2017-11-23|| Win||align=left| Kento Haraguchi|| RISE 121 - DEAD or ALIVE -57 kg Tournament, Quarter Final || Tokyo, Japan || Ext.R Decision (Unanimous) || 4|| 3:00
|-  style="text-align:center; background:#CCFFCC;"
| 2017-09-16|| Win||align=left| Seiki Ueyama|| Shoot Boxing 2017 act.4|| Tokyo, Japan || Decision (Unanimous) || 5|| 3:00
|-
! style=background:white colspan=9 |
|-  style="text-align:center; background:#FFBBBB;"
| 2017-06-16|| Loss ||align=left| Kazuki Fukada|| Shoot Boxing 2017 act.3|| Tokyo, Japan || Decision (Majority) || 5|| 3:00
|-
! style=background:white colspan=9 |
|-  style="text-align:center; background:#CCFFCC;"
| 2017-04-08|| Win ||align=left| Genki ||Shoot Boxing 2017 act.2|| Tokyo, Japan || Decision (Unanimous) || 3|| 3:00
|-  style="text-align:center; background:#CCFFCC;"
| 2017-02-11|| Win ||align=left| Shuto Miyazaki || Shoot Boxing 2017 act.1|| Tokyo, Japan || Decision (Unanimous) || 3|| 3:00
|-  style="text-align:center; background:#CCFFCC;"
| 2016-11-11|| Win||align=left| Seiki Ueyama|| Shoot Boxing World Tournament S-cup 2016|| Tokyo, Japan || KO (Left Hook) || 3|| 2:14
|-
! style=background:white colspan=9 |
|-  style="text-align:center; background:#FFBBBB;"
| 2016-06-01|| Loss||align=left| Eisaku Ogasawara || REBELS.43 || Tokyo, Japan || Decision (Unanimous)|| 3 || 3:00
|-  style="text-align:center; background:#CCFFCC;"
| 2016-04-03|| Win||align=left| Takanobu Sano|| Shoot Boxing 2016 act.2	|| Tokyo, Japan || Decision (Unanimous) || 3|| 3:00
|-  style="text-align:center; background:#CCFFCC;"
| 2016-02-13|| Win||align=left| Yukinori Ogasawara|| Shoot Boxing 2016 act.1|| Tokyo, Japan || TKO (Right Hook) || 3|| 0:13
|-  style="text-align:center; background:#FFBBBB;"
| 2015-08-01|| Loss||align=left| Tenshin Nasukawa || BLADE FIGHTING CHAMPIONSHIP 2 JAPAN CUP −55 kg, Final|| Tokyo, Japan|| TKO (3 knockdowns) || 1 || 1:41
|-
! style=background:white colspan=9 |
|-  style="text-align:center; background:#CCFFCC;"
| 2015-08-01|| Win||align=left| Yuta Murakoshi || BLADE FIGHTING CHAMPIONSHIP 2 JAPAN CUP −55 kg, Semi Finals || Tokyo, Japan || Decision (Unanimous) || 3 || 3:00
|-  style="text-align:center; background:#CCFFCC;"
| 2015-08-01|| Win||align=left| Masahide Kudo || BLADE FIGHTING CHAMPIONSHIP 2 JAPAN CUP −55 kg, Quarter Finals || Tokyo, Japan || KO (Right Hook)|| 1 || 1:53
|-  style="text-align:center; background:#CCFFCC;"
| 2015-06-21|| Win||align=left| Keisuke Miyamoto|| Shoot Boxing 2015～SB30th Anniversary～ act.3|| Tokyo, Japan || Decision (Unanimous) || 3|| 3:00
|-  style="text-align:center; background:#CCFFCC;"
| 2015-04-18|| Win||align=left| Takayuki Umehara||Shoot Boxing 2015～SB30th Anniversary～ act.2|| Tokyo, Japan || Decision (Unanimous) || 3|| 3:00
|-  style="text-align:center; background:#CCFFCC;"
| 2015-02-21|| Win||align=left| Shuto Miyazaki|| Shoot Boxing 2015～SB30th Anniversary～ act.1|| Tokyo, Japan || Decision (Unanimous) || 3|| 3:00
|-  style="text-align:center; background:#CCFFCC;"
| 2014-11-30|| Win||align=left| Kazuyuki Fushimi|| Shoot Boxing World Tournament S-cup 2014|| Tokyo, Japan || KO (Knee) || 4|| 1:00
|-
! style=background:white colspan=9 |
|-  style="text-align:center; background:#CCFFCC;"
| 2014-11-02|| Win||align=left| Yang Chul Min|| Shoot Boxing Young Caesar Cup Central #11 TOYOKAWA|| Toyokawa, Aichi, Japan || KO || 2||
|-  style="text-align:center; background:#CCFFCC;"
| 2014-09-20|| Win||align=left| Koya Shimada|| Shoot Boxing 2014 act.4|| Tokyo, Japan || Decision (Unanimous) || 3|| 3:00
|-  style="text-align:center; background:#FFBBBB;"
| 2014-08-17|| Loss||align=left| Masao Fujimoto|| Shoot Boxing OSAKA 2014 ALPINISME || Osaka, Japan || Ext.R Decision (Split) || 4|| 3:00
|-  style="text-align:center; background:#CCFFCC;"
| 2014-06-21|| Win||align=left| Kentaro Nagai||Shoot Boxing 2014 act.3|| Tokyo, Japan || TKO (Referee Stoppage) || 1|| 2:40
|-  style="text-align:center; background:#CCFFCC;"
| 2014-04-13|| Win||align=left| Imlon Luklontan||Shoot Boxing in TOYOKAWA UNCHAIN.1|| Toyokawa, Aichi, Japan || KO  || 2|| 2:34
|-  style="text-align:center; background:#CCFFCC;"
| 2013-12-15|| Win||align=left| Yukinobu Nakatsuka||DEEP☆KICK 18|| Osaka, Japan || Decision (Unanimous) || 3|| 3:00
|-  style="text-align:center; background:#CCFFCC;"
| 2013-11-03|| Win||align=left| Seiki Ueyama ||Shoot Boxing Young Caesar Cup Central #8 TOYOKAWA|| Toyokawa, Aichi, Japan || Ext.R Decision (Unanimous) || 4|| 3:00
|-  style="text-align:center; background:#FFBBBB;"
| 2013-06-23|| Loss||align=left| Kazuyuki Fushimi||Shoot Boxing 2013 act.3 || Tokyo, Japan ||  Decision (Majority) || 4|| 3:00
|-  style="text-align:center; background:#CCFFCC;"
| 2013-04-07|| Win||align=left| Genki Izumi||Shoot Boxing YOUNG CAESAR CUP CENTRAL#6 TOYOKAWA|| Toyokawa, Aichi, Japan || Decision  || 3|| 3:00
|-  style="text-align:center; background:#CCFFCC;"
| 2012-12-23|| Win||align=left| Toshiyuki Nitamizu||OYAJI & ROOKIES DEEP in KASUGAI|| Kasugai, Aichi, Japan || Decision (Split) || 2|| 3:00
|-  style="text-align:center; background:#CCFFCC;"
| 2012-11-14|| Win||align=left| Shin Isobe||Shoot Boxing Young Caesar Cup Central ＃5 TOYOKAWA|| Toyokawa, Aichi, Japan || Decision (Unanimous) || 3|| 3:00
|-  style="text-align:center; background:#CCFFCC;"
| 2012-05-13|| Win||align=left| Sho Ikeno||Shoot Boxing Young Caesar Cup MACS|| Toyokawa, Aichi, Japan || Decision (Unanimous) || 2|| 3:00
|-  style="text-align:center; background:#CCFFCC;"
| 2012-02-12|| Win||align=left| Barrett||Shoot Boxing Young Caesar Cup Central2012 #3 TOYOKAWA|| Toyokawa, Aichi, Japan || Decision (Unanimous) ||2|| 3:00
|-  style="text-align:center; background:#CCFFCC;"
| 2011-11-06|| Win||align=left| Shohei Nishimura||Shoot Boxing SHOOT the SHOOTO 2011|| Tokyo, Japan || Decision (Majority) || 3|| 3:00
|-  style="text-align:center; background:#CCFFCC;"
| 2011-07-31|| Win||align=left| Hikaru Kawano||Shoot Boxing in NIIGATA 2011|| Niigata, Japan || Decision (Unanimous) || 3|| 3:00
|-
| colspan=9 | Legend:    

|- style="background:#cfc;"
| 2011-12-04|| Win || align="left" | Kimiya Ikehata  || Amateur SHOOT BOXING ||Nagoya, Japan||Decision (Unanimous) ||2 || 3:00
|- style="background:#cfc;"
| 2011-12-04|| Win || align="left" | Fumito Shintaku || Amateur SHOOT BOXING ||Nagoya, Japan|| TKO || 1 || 2:30
|- style="background:#c5d2ea;"
| 2011-09-18|| Draw|| align="left" | Kenichi Takeuchi|| DEEP CAGE IMPACT 2011 in HAMAMATSU ||Tokyo, Japan|| Decision|| 3 || 3:00
|- style="background:#cfc;"
| 2011-03-13|| Win || align="left" | Naoki Inoue || SHOOT BOXING Young Cesar||Toyokawa, Aichi, Japan|| Decision (Unanimous)|| 3 || 2:00
|- style="background:#cfc;"
| 2011-02-06|| Win || align="left" |  || DEEP SHIZUOKA IMPACT||Shizuoka, Japan|| Decision (Unanimous)|| 2 || 5:00
|- style="background:#FFBBBB;"
| 2010-10-31|| Loss || align="left" |  Ren Morita || NAGOYA KICK ～WALK ON～||Nagoya, Japan|| Decision (Unanimous)|| 2 || 2:00
|- style="background:#FFBBBB;"
| 2010-09-12|| Loss || align="left" |  Hyui Ishimaru || CENTRAL KICK 2||Nagoya, Japan|| Decision (Unanimous)|| 2 || 2:00
|- style="background:#FFBBBB;"
| 2010-07-18|| Loss || align="left" |  Mizuki Ootaka || Striking Challenge 23||Nagoya, Japan|| Decision (Unanimous)|| 2 || 2:00
|-
| colspan=9 | Legend:

See also
 List of male kickboxers

References

Living people
1996 births
Japanese male kickboxers
Bantamweight kickboxers
Sportspeople from Aichi Prefecture
ONE Championship kickboxers